John Munro, 4th of Newmore was an 18th-century Scottish soldier and politician from Ross-shire, Scotland.  He was seated at Newmore Castle, in Easter Ross, Scotland.

Early life

John Munro, 4th of Newmore was a great-grandson of Sir George Munro, 1st of Newmore.
 
According to historian Alexander Mackenzie, John Munro, 4th of Newmore was the strongest man in Ross-shire in his day and that tradition relates the most extraordinary feats of strength performed by him. One old tradition is that Munro of Newmore had succeeded in raising a piece of ordnance to his chest which Mackenzie of Fairburn could only raise to his knee.

Parliamentary career

John Munro, 4th of Newmore represented the county of Ross in parliament from 1733 to 1734.

Military career

John Munro joined the army and was appointed captain in the 42nd Royal Highlanders, otherwise known as the Black Watch in May 1740.

Mutiny of the Black Watch

In 1743, 109 men of the Black Watch regiment mutinied while stationed in London, England and attempted to return to Scotland. However, Munro of Newmore was one of the officers who went after them and persuaded them to return.

Battle of Fontenoy

Munro of Newmore fought in Flanders at the Battle of Fontenoy on 11 May 1745, where he highly distinguished himself. He fought under the command of his distant cousin Colonel Sir Robert Munro, 6th Baronet, chief of the Highland Clan Munro. On account of John Munro's bravery, John was on 17 July 1745 promoted to the rank of lieutenant colonel.

General Stewart of Garth referring to the Battle of Fontenoy and John Munro's promotion says:

John Munro died in 1749.

References

1749 deaths
Year of birth unknown
John Munro
People from Ross and Cromarty
42nd Regiment of Foot officers
British Army personnel of the War of the Austrian Succession
Members of the Parliament of Great Britain for Scottish constituencies
British MPs 1727–1734